Stanley Brown (15 September 1941 – 15 March 2018) was an English footballer who played as a wing half in the Football League.

Life and career
Brown was born in Lewes, East Sussex. Between 1960 and 1972, he made 353 league appearances for Fulham, scoring 16 goals in that period. He was sent on loan to Brighton & Hove Albion in 1972, before moving to Colchester United. At the end of the 1972–73 season, Brown moved on to Wimbledon. He later played non-league football for clubs including Margate, Haywards Heath Town, Ringmer, Southwick and Burgess Hill Town, and went on to coach children in the Lewes area. Brown died in March 2018 at the age of 76.

Brown was one of six brothers who all played football; two of the six, Alan and Irvin, also played at Football League level.

Honours
Fulham
 Football League Third Division runner-up: 1970–71

References

External links
 

1941 births
2018 deaths
People from Lewes
English footballers
Association football wing halves
Fulham F.C. players
Brighton & Hove Albion F.C. players
Colchester United F.C. players
Wimbledon F.C. players
Margate F.C. players
Haywards Heath Town F.C. players
Ringmer F.C. players
Southwick F.C. players
Burgess Hill Town F.C. players
English Football League players
Southern Football League players